"Girl from Mars" is a song by Northern Irish band Ash, the second to be released from their debut studio album, 1977 (1996). The song was written by Tim Wheeler when he was sixteen and was played by the band on their first Top of the Pops appearance two weeks after their A-level exams. It was released on 31 July 1995 on CD, 7-inch vinyl, and cassette formats. "Girl from Mars" was Ash's first top-forty single, reaching number 11 on the UK Singles Chart, number five on the Icelandic Singles Chart and number 16 on the Irish Singles Chart. It also peaked at number 86 in Australia in March 1997.

The song is featured on the greatest hits collection "Intergalactic Sonic 7″s", the soundtrack to the television program Gilmore Girls "Our Little Corner of the World", and live versions can be found on their Live at the Wireless album, the Tokyo Blitz DVD and the Numbskull EP. The track has also been used by NASA as the hold music on their telephone lines.

Music video
Two different videos exists for the single. The first, the UK promo video, was directed by Peter Christopherson and is described  by the band as a "cross between 'Give It Away' by the Red Hot Chili Peppers and the 'Natrel Plus' TV ad". The band (especially drummer Rick McMurray) hated the video so much that when the time came to release the song in America, they re-filmed it. Directed by Jesse Peretz (who also directed Foo Fighters's "Big Me" video), the video sees Ash playing the song as part of an art exhibition, and mesmerizing a small girl watching the band.

Track listing
CD, 7-inch, cassette single
 "Girl from Mars" (Wheeler)
 "Astral Conversations with Toulouse-Lautrec" (Ash)
 "Cantina Band" (John Williams)

Charts

Certifications

References

1995 songs
1995 singles
Ash (band) songs
Infectious Records singles
Songs written by Tim Wheeler
Bubblegum pop songs